Ipuã is a municipality in the state of São Paulo in Brazil. The population is 16,604 (2020 est.) in an area of 466 km². The elevation is 555 m.

References

Municipalities in São Paulo (state)